FBP is a 9 mm submachine gun originally developed from a design first conceived in 1940 by Gonçalves Cardoso, an officer of artillery in the Portuguese Army. The onset of World War II halted development of the weapon, which was further modified and put into production in 1948.

History
The submachine gun was produced by the Fábrica de Braço de Prata weapon factory at Lisbon, whose initials FBP gave the name to the weapon, adopted for service as the m/948 in 1948. It utilized the large bolt and telescoping operating spring of the German MP40 submachine gun, and the collapsible wire stock of the American M3 submachine gun.  Unusual for submachineguns, the m/948 was fitted with a barrel sleeve with a mount to accept the standard Portuguese Mauser bayonet.

The original version of the submachine gun (the FBP m/948) only allowed for fully automatic fire. An upgraded version ( designated FBP m/963) introduced in 1961 also allowed for semi-automatic fire.

The weapon was primarily issued to officers and NCOs in the Portuguese Armed Forces and security forces, along with quantities of ex-German MP 34 submachine guns.  In Portuguese service it was used in combat in Angola, Portuguese Guinea, Mozambique, Portuguese India and Portuguese Timor.  It was eventually replaced in service by the 9 mm Uzi and the collapsible-stock version of the standard m/961 G3 rifle.

In 1976 Fábrica Militar de Braço de Prata, led by Major Engenheiro Mário Tavares, developed a modernized version of the FBP with a barrel cooling sleeve, but it never entered production.

See also
Hafdasa C-4
Halcon M-1943
Sola Super
Portuguese Colonial Wars

References

Submachine guns of Portugal
9mm Parabellum submachine guns
Weapons of Portugal